The 1955 Argus Trophy was a motor race staged at the Albert Park Circuit in Victoria, Australia on 27 March 1955.
The race, which was open to Formula Libre Racing Cars, was contested over 32 laps, a distance of 100 miles.
It was organised by the Light Car Club of Australia and sponsored by The Argus, a Melbourne newspaper.

Results

Notes:

 Number of starters: Unknown
 Number of finishers: Unknown
 Winner's race time: 69 minutes 37 seconds (86.6 mph)
 Fastest Lap: Reg Hunt, 2 minutes 4 seconds (90.5 mph)

References

Argus Trophy
Motorsport at Albert Park